Aulonemia fulgor is a species of bamboo in the genus Aulonemia. It is found mainly in North America.
It is part of the grass family and endemic to Latin America.

References

fulgor